Lamont seamount chain is a chain of submarine mountains in the eastern Pacific Ocean which are named "Sasha", "MIB", "MOK", "DTD" and "NEW".

These seamounts are submarine volcanoes of Pleistocene to Holocene age that are usually capped off by summit calderas and craters. They have erupted lava flows of tholeiitic composition; the last eruption may have occurred less than 8,000 years ago.

Geography and geomorphology 

The Lamont seamount chain is a group of five seamounts in the Pacific Ocean; from southeast to northwest they are known as "Sasha", "MIB", "MOK", "DTD" and "NEW" and there is an additional unnamed seamount southwest from "NEW". The seamounts were discovered in 1983 and named later.

Horseshoe-shaped volcanic ridges accompany the calderas and lava effusion appears to have preferentially occurred on the margins of the calderas, along with mass wasting.

Geology 

While the Clipperton Fracture Zone is located just north, the East Pacific Rise lies east of the seamounts; Sasha Seamount lies just  from the Rise. It appears to contain a magma chamber at that latitude and seems to have produced voluminous volcanism that generated a topographic elevation that is now associated with the Lamont seamounts.

The seamounts have produced hyaloclastites, sheet- and lobe-like lava flows as well as pillow lavas and talus. The volcanism may be ultimately the consequence of hotspot activity.

Composition 

The Lamont seamount chain has erupted tholeiitic magmas which contain olivine and plagioclase phenocrysts as well as spinel but little clinopyroxene. All samples taken from the seamounts contain sulfide globules, including cubanite and pyrrhotite. In some samples, carbonates, celadonite, iron hydroxides, manganese crusts and mica are found. They are relatively primitive magmas that were not stored over long timespans in the crust and undergo simple fractional crystallization processes; their sources appear to be distinct from the magma sources of the East Pacific Rise.

Geochronology 

The Lamont seamounts probably formed within the last 400,000 years. While the ages of the seamounts are not known, they are by necessity younger than the underlying 740,000 - 100,000 years old seafloor; the lack of sediment cover and thick ferromanganese deposits as well as the youthful appearance of lava flows also speaks for a young age although there is no evidence of hydrothermal activity, past or present. The reflectance of the seafloorm has been used to infer increasing ages from 33,000 years at Sasha to 230,000 at "MOK". Radiocarbon dating of foraminifera encased in lava flows of "NEW" seamount has yielded an age of 18,540 ± 216 radiocarbon years ago, indicating recent activity; additionally, a sample from Sasha seamount may be less than 8,000 years old on the basis of a radium-thorium isotope disequilibrium.

References

Sources 

  Via GeoScienceWorld
 
 
 
 
 
 

Holocene volcanoes
Seamounts of the Pacific Ocean